Fairul Izwan Abdul Muin (born 3 November 1982) is a Malaysian lawn bowler.

Bowls career

World Championships
Muin won a pairs bronze medal at the 2008 World Outdoor Bowls Championship in Christchurch, New Zealand. In 2020 he was selected for the 2020 World Outdoor Bowls Championship in Australia.

Commonwealth Games
Muin competed in both the men's fours and the men's pairs events at the 2014 Commonwealth Games. He narrowly missed out on a medal in the men's fours event, coming in fourth place, but won a silver medal in the men's pairs Four years earlier he had won a bronze medal in the pairs at the 2010 Commonwealth Games in Delhi.

In 2022, he competed in the men's singles and the men's pairs at the 2022 Commonwealth Games.

Asia Pacific
Muin has won ten medals at the Asia Pacific Bowls Championships, a silver pairs and bronze fours in 2003, a gold pairs in 2005 in the pairs with Safuan Said, a gold fours and bronze pairs in 2009, and a silver pairs and bronze fours in 2015. His ninth and tenth medals was a pairs bronze and fours bronze at the 2019 Asia Pacific Bowls Championships in the Gold Coast, Queensland.

Southeast Asian Games
Muin has also won four gold medals in Lawn bowls at the Southeast Asian Games, a pairs gold at the 2005 Southeast Asian Games and triples in 2007 Southeast Asian Games, a gold in pairs at the 2017 Southeast Asian Games and a gold in Fours at the 2019 Southeast Asian Games.

References

1982 births
Living people
Bowls players at the 2010 Commonwealth Games
Bowls players at the 2014 Commonwealth Games
Bowls players at the 2022 Commonwealth Games
Commonwealth Games silver medallists for Malaysia
Malaysian male bowls players
Commonwealth Games bronze medallists for Malaysia
Commonwealth Games medallists in lawn bowls
Southeast Asian Games medalists in lawn bowls
Southeast Asian Games gold medalists for Malaysia
Competitors at the 2005 Southeast Asian Games
Competitors at the 2007 Southeast Asian Games
Competitors at the 2017 Southeast Asian Games
Competitors at the 2019 Southeast Asian Games
Medallists at the 2010 Commonwealth Games
Medallists at the 2014 Commonwealth Games